Aleksandr Genrikhovich Turchin (born 2 July 1975) is a Belarusian politician serving as the chairman of the Minsk Region since 3 December 2019. He previously served as the first deputy prime minister of Belarus from 2018 to 2019.

On 17 December 2020, Turchin was sanctioned by the European Union.

References 

1975 births
Living people
Belarusian politicians
Government ministers of Belarus